Pool A of the 2016 Fed Cup Asia/Oceania Group II was one of two pools in the Asia/Oceania Group II of the 2016 Fed Cup. Five teams competed in a round robin competition, with the top team and bottom teams proceeding to their respective sections of the play-offs: the top team played for advancement to Group I.

Standings

Round-robin

Philippines vs. Iran

Hong Kong vs. Pacific Oceania

Hong Kong vs. Bahrain

Pacific Oceania vs. Iran

Philippines vs. Pacific Oceania

Iran vs. Bahrain

Philippines vs. Hong Kong

Pacific Oceania vs. Bahrain

Philippines vs. Bahrain

Hong Kong vs. Iran

See also
Fed Cup structure

References

External links
 Fed Cup website

2016 Fed Cup Asia/Oceania Zone